Vroni König-Salmi (born 9 July 1969) is a Swiss orienteering competitor.  She won the 2001 Sprint distance World Orienteering Championships, and is two times Relay World Champion, from   2003 and 2005, as member of the Swiss winning teams. Also an individual bronze medal from 2005 (Long distance), and Relay bronze medals from 1997 and 2006. Married to Finnish orienteer Janne Salmi.

References

External links
 
 Vroni König-Salmi at World of O Runners

1969 births
Living people
Swiss orienteers
Female orienteers
Foot orienteers
World Orienteering Championships medalists